WTQ may refer to:
 What the Quap, internet slang
 Effective torque,  also known as wheel torque
 Wet Tropics of Queensland